Bosara modesta is a moth in the family Geometridae first described by William Warren in 1893. It is found in the north-eastern Himalayas and on Java.

References

Moths described in 1893
Eupitheciini
Moths of Asia